Taragüi can refer to:

 The Guarani language name of the city and province of Corrientes, Argentina.
 An Argentine brand of tea and yerba mate.